Zbiroh is a town in Rokycany District in the Plzeň Region of the Czech Republic. It has about 2,500 inhabitants.

Administrative parts
Villages of Chotětín, Jablečno, Přísednice and Třebnuška are administrative parts of Zbiroh.

Geography
It lies in the Křivoklát Highlands.

History
The first written mention of Zbiroh is from 1230. It was a market village which was promoted to a market town in 1369. During the rule of the Rosenberg family, Zbiroh developed and acquired various rights. In 1897, Zbiroh was promoted to a town by Franz Joseph I.

Sights
Zbiroh Castle is the most important monument. The original Romanesque-Gothic castle was built at the end of the 12th century or in the early 13th century, and belongs to the oldest aristocratic residences in the country. At the end of the 16th century, it was rebuilt into its current appearance of a large Renaissance château. The landmark of the original castle part is the oldest detached watch tower in the Czech Republic.

Notable people
Josef Václav Sládek (1845–1912), poet

References

External links

Cities and towns in the Czech Republic
Populated places in Rokycany District